Aloja Parish is an administrative unit of Limbaži Municipality, Latvia. It was created in 2010 from the countryside territory of Aloja town. At the beginning of 2014, the population of the parish was 923.

Towns, villages and settlements of Aloja parish 
 Nikšas
 Smilgas
 Stābeģi
 Ungurpils

References 

Parishes of Latvia
Limbaži Municipality
Vidzeme